Rivera is a settlement located near the town of Carhué in the southwest region of the Province of Buenos Aires, Argentina, in Adolfo Alsina Partido. Rivera was founded by Jewish immigrants who came from Russia, Poland and other parts of Eastern Europe at the beginning of 20th century.

History
During the first decade of 20th century, Jews persecuted by the Czar Nicholas II of Russia from different places in the world began arriving in Argentina. They settled down mainly in the provinces of Entre Rios and Santa Fe in colonies established by the Jewish Colonization Association, with a seat in London and directed by Baron Maurice de Hirsch.

Many of these settlers laid down in the fields around Rivera. Initially, a little more than 70 families settled the area, who after years of perseverance and tenacity, managed to turn that thin earth into a prosperous place. By 2006, Rivera had nearly 3,000 inhabitants.

External links

 Rivera and its Colonies
 Rivera broadcast

Jewish Argentine settlements
Populated places in Buenos Aires Province
Adolfo Alsina Partido
Polish diaspora in South America
Russian diaspora in South America
Russian-Jewish diaspora